Guizhou Ironworks were established in 1891 as part of the third phase of the Self Strengthening Movement in the Qing dynasty.

References

Companies based in Guizhou
Chinese companies established in 1891
Manufacturing companies established in 1891